George W. Bush Childhood Home is a historic house that was home to former U.S. Presidents George W. Bush and George H. W. Bush from 1951 to 1955. It is located at 1412 W. Ohio Ave. in Midland, Texas.

The home was built in 1940 and was purchased by the Bush family in 1951 for $9,000. They lived in the  home until late 1955. It was also the earliest childhood home of Governor Jeb Bush. The house was added to the National Register of Historic Places in 2004. It was purchased for $100,000 to become the museum, which had its opening dedication on April 11, 2006.

See also

National Register of Historic Places listings in Midland County, Texas
Recorded Texas Historic Landmarks in Midland County

References

External links

Official website 

Bush family residences
George W. Bush
Houses completed in 1940
Houses on the National Register of Historic Places in Texas
Museums in Midland County, Texas
Presidential homes in the United States
Presidential museums in Texas
Buildings and structures in Midland, Texas
Houses in Midland County, Texas
National Register of Historic Places in Midland County, Texas
Recorded Texas Historic Landmarks
1940 establishments in Texas
Museums established in 2006